David Wilkinson Jenkins (born June 29, 1936) is an American former figure skater. He is the 1960 Olympic champion, the 1956 Olympic bronze medalist, a three-time World champion, and a four-time U.S. national champion.

Personal life 
Jenkins was born on June 29, 1936, in Akron, Ohio. He is the younger brother of Hayes Alan Jenkins, also an American former figure skater. 

He studied at Case Western Reserve University School of Medicine during his competitive career. He took a leave of absence during his time with Ice Follies. After graduating in 1963, he became a practicing physician.

Jenkins graduated with an M.D. in 1963 and immediately after served two years in the U.S. Air Force. In June of 1965 he married Barbara Ruth Boling and settled in Tulsa, where he became a gastroenterologist. Neither his wife nor his three children skate.

Skating career 
Jenkins won his first senior national medal, silver, at the 1954 U.S. Championships. His first world medal, bronze, came at the 1955 World Championships. He received the bronze medal at the 1956 Winter Olympics while his brother won the gold.

The brothers received financial support from the Broadmoor Hotel in Colorado Springs, Colorado, and a foundation.

In 1957, David Jenkins became the U.S. national champion and won the first of his three consecutive world titles. He performed a triple Axel jump in a 1957 exhibition, 21 years before that jump was landed for the first time in competition.

After taking his fourth consecutive national title, he won the gold medal at the 1960 Winter Olympics. Edi Scholdan served as his coach.

Following the 1960 Olympics, Jenkins declined to compete at the 1960 World Figure Skating Championships and turned professional, joining the Ice Follies.

Competitive highlights

References

American male single skaters
Case Western Reserve University School of Medicine alumni
Figure skaters at the 1956 Winter Olympics
Figure skaters at the 1960 Winter Olympics
Sportspeople from Akron, Ohio
Olympic bronze medalists for the United States in figure skating
Olympic gold medalists for the United States in figure skating
1936 births
Living people
World Figure Skating Championships medalists
Medalists at the 1956 Winter Olympics
Medalists at the 1960 Winter Olympics